WMXX may refer to:

 WMXX-FM, a radio station (103.1 FM) licensed to Jackson, Tennessee, United States
 WrestleMania XX, the 20th professional wrestling WrestleMania pay-per-view by World Wrestling Entertainment (WWE)